Hugh Graham is a Jamaican politician from the People's National Party.

References 

Living people
21st-century Jamaican politicians
People from Saint Catherine Parish
Members of the House of Representatives of Jamaica
People's National Party (Jamaica) politicians
Year of birth missing (living people)
Members of the 14th Parliament of Jamaica